The surname Osti or Osty may refer to:

 Carlo Osti (born 1958), Italian footballer
 Eugène Osty (1874–1938), French physician and psychical researcher
 Éva Osty, birth name of Éva Darlan (born 1948), French actress
 Jean Osty (1920–2011), pen name Jean Lartéguy, French writer, journalist and former soldier
 Josip Osti (1945–2021), Bosnian poet, prose writer and essayist, literary critic, anthologist and translator
 Massimo Osti (1944–2005), Italian garment engineer